El Külüg Shad Irbis Qağan (full title: Yǐqūlìshīyǐpíkĕhàn 乙屈利失乙毗可汗, personal name: Ashina Moheduo 阿史那莫賀咄) was Khagan of the Western Turkic Kaghanate.

Reign 
He was ruling south of Ili River, which was populated mostly by Nushibi tribes, after his father was murdered. He soon died, leaving the throne to his nephew Irbis Ishbara Yabgu Qaghan. His son was Irbis Seguy.

References 

640 deaths
7th-century Turkic people
Ashina house of the Turkic Empire
Göktürk khagans